San Francisco Earthquake & Fire: April 18, 1906 is an American short black-and-white documentary silent film. The film documents the aftermath of the 1906 San Francisco earthquake. This film is "narrated" with the standard text slides between scenes.

In 2005, the film was added to the United States National Film Registry as being deemed "culturally, historically, or aesthetically significant".
The Library of Congress Motion Picture, Broadcasting and Recorded Sound Division released the 13-minute film.

References

External links

 (film was released by Library of Congress)

1906 films
American silent short films
American black-and-white films
1900s short documentary films
United States National Film Registry films
Documentary films about San Francisco
Films about the 1906 San Francisco earthquake
American short documentary films
1900s American films
Articles containing video clips
Documentary films about earthquakes